Ekant Sen (born 21 June 1995) is an Indian cricketer. He made his List A debut for Himachal Pradesh in the 2016–17 Vijay Hazare Trophy on 4 March 2017. He made his first-class debut for Himachal Pradesh in the 2018–19 Ranji Trophy on 1 November 2018. He made his Twenty20 debut for Himachal Pradesh in the 2018–19 Syed Mushtaq Ali Trophy on 21 February 2019.

References

External links
 

1995 births
Living people
Indian cricketers
Himachal Pradesh cricketers
Place of birth missing (living people)